Tod is the surname of:

People
 Andy Tod (born 1971), Scottish footballer
 Archibald Tod (584–1656), Scottish landowner, twice Provost of Edinburgh
 David Tod (1805–1868), American politician and industrialist
 George Tod, British surveyor and hothouse builder
 George Tod (judge) (1773—1841), American politician and judge
 George Tod (footballer) (1880–1930), Scottish footballer
 Isabella Tod (1836–1896), Scottish suffragist
 James Tod (1782–1835), British colonial officer and political agent
 James Tod of Deanston (1795–1858), Scottish lawyer and landowner
 Joanne Tod (born 1953), Canadian lecturer and painter
 Jodi Tod (born 1981), New Zealand netball player
 John Tod (1779–1830), American politician
 Jonathan Tod (born 1939), British Royal Navy officer
 J. Kennedy Tod, Scottish financier of American railroads and benefactor of Anna Maxwell
 Malcolm Tod (1897—1968), British actor
 Quentin Tod (1884—1947), British actor and dancer
 Ronnie Tod (1905–1975), British Army officer

Fictional characters
 the title character of The Tale of Mr. Tod, a children's book written and illustrated by Beatrix Potter

See also
 Senator Tod (disambiguation)